Uusi Lahti is a free newspaper published in Lahti, Finland, and distributed in Lahti and nearby communities. It is delivered on Wednesdays and Saturdays. The current editor-in-chief is Tommi Berg, who succeeded Kari Naskinen in 2008. Uusi Lahti was the best citymagazine in Finland in 2014.

References

External links 
Official web site

Lahti
Finnish-language newspapers
Mass media in Lahti